Lomatium bradshawii, also known as Bradshaw's desert parsley, is an endangered perennial herb native to Oregon and Washington, United States. Lomatium bradshawii was thought to be extinct until 1979, when it was rediscovered by a University of Oregon graduate. This herb was common in the Willamette Valley before agricultural development and fire prevention which has allowed shrubs and weeds to invade. Most known populations of Lomatium bradshawii are within ten miles of Eugene, Oregon. In the Willamette Valley, populations exist in the Oregon counties Lane, Benton, Linn, and Marion, and in Washington Lomatium bradshawii grows in Puget Sound.  The largest population of this herb is in Camas Meadows, Washington, with a population of 10,7900,00 +/- 2,010,000, and the Berry Botanic Garden keeps a seedbank.

Lomatium bradshawii grows in low elevations along rivers or in regularly flooded prairies. Yellow inflorescences of Lomatium bradshawii occur from April to May.

References

External links
photo of herbarium specimen at Missouri Botanical Garden, collected in Oregon in 1921

bradshawii
Flora of Oregon
Flora of Washington (state)
Endemic flora of the United States
Endangered flora of the United States
Plants described in 1934
Taxa named by Lincoln Constance
Taxa named by Mildred Esther Mathias